A Long Time Listening is the first full-length album by the alternative rock band Agent Fresco.

Track listing

Personnel

Musical performers
Arnór Dan Arnarson – vocals
Hrafnkell Örn Guðjónsson – drums, percussion, piano, vocals
Vignir Rafn Hilmarsson – bass, electric upright bass, vocals
Þórarinn Guðnason – guitar, piano, strings, programming, vocals
Þórður Gunnar Þorvaldsson – accordion on "Paused"
Guðrún Halla Guðnadóttir – intro guitar on "A Long Time Listening"

Additional personnel
Þórarinn Guðnason, Hrafnkell Guðjónsson – production
Magnús Øder, Þórarinn Guðnason – engineering
Þórarinn Guðnason – mixing
Axel Flex Árnason – mastering
Liv Caroline Hotvedt Larsen – artwork and layout
Liv Caroline Hotvedt Larsen, Anders Rimhoff, Ida Oline – photos

References

2010 debut albums
Agent Fresco albums